This is a list of elections and referendums held in the Philippines.

General and local elections 

For much of its history since 1935, the Philippines has been governed as a presidential unitary republic. The term "general election" is not predominantly used in the Philippines, but for the purposes of this article, a "general election" may refer to an election day where the presidency or at least a class of members of Congress are on the ballot. Since 1992, on presidential election days, the presidency, half of the Senate, the House of Representatives and all local officials above the barangay level, but below the regional level, are at stake. On a "midterm election", it's the same, except for the presidency is not at stake.

Local elections above the barangay level, but below the regional level, are synchronized with elections for national positions.

Barangay elections are usually held separately from general and local elections.

Regional elections 
Regional elections are held for the autonomous regions. There had been two autonomous regions in the Philippines: the Autonomous Region in Muslim Mindanao (ARMM), and the Bangsamoro that replaced it. Regional elections were not synchronized with general elections above, but on 2013 and 2016, they were. The 2016 election was the last ARMM election. After the approval of the Bangsamoro in a plebiscite, there was a transition period, and the first Bangsamoro election is expected to be held on 2022.

National referendums 
Referendums are on an ad hoc basis. Before 1973, these were mostly used on amending the constitution. Starting from martial law up to the People Power Revolution, referendums became more frequent. After the People Power Revolution, there had only been one national referendum, on the approval of the current constitution.

Recall elections 
Only locally elected officials can be recalled. These are the recall elections above the barangay level:

Special elections 

Both chambers of Congress conduct special elections (known as "by-elections" elsewhere) once a seat becomes vacant.

The upcoming Bangsamoro Parliament can also hold special elections for vacancies for seats from its parliamentary districts.

A special election can also be called if the offices of president and vice president of the Philippines are vacant in the same time.

People's Initiatives 

People's Initiative is a common appellative in the Philippines that refers to either a mode for constitutional amendment provided by the 1987 Philippine Constitution or to the act of pushing an initiative (national or local) allowed by the Initiative and Referendum Act of 1987. While the Supreme Court had declared amending the constitution via initiative as "fatally defective" and those inoperable, the Initiative and Referendum Act of 1987 can still be used to initiative initiatives for statues, ordinances and resolutions at the national and local level.

While there had been no referendums at the national level, this has been successfully implemented at the local level, particularly in barangays.

External links 
 Official website of the Commission on Elections